Discovery Kids was a Canadian English language specialty television channel owned by Corus Entertainment and Discovery Communications.

It was a Canadian version of the U.S. channel of the same name (now known as Discovery Family), which aired children's programming oriented towards nature, science, and technology subjects. It was aimed at kids aged four to eight.

History
In December 2000, Corus Entertainment, on behalf of an organization to be incorporated, was granted approval by the Canadian Radio-television and Telecommunications Commission (CRTC) to launch Discovery Kids, described as "a national English-language Category 2 specialty television service that offers children of all ages a fun, entertaining way to satisfy their natural curiosity with stimulating, imaginative programming that asks the questions of how? and why? and awakens the power of the mind."

The channel was launched on September 3, 2001, with the Earth Science for Children episode "All About Fossils" being the first program to air on the network. Discovery Communications purchased a minority stake in the service either prior to or shortly after the channel's launch.

In September 2009, Corus confirmed it would shut down the channel, with no reason being given. The channel was replaced on most service providers on November 2 with a Canadian version of Nickelodeon, which however, operates under a licence originally intended for a "YTV OneWorld" network. Because it operates under a separate licence, cable and satellite companies that carried Discovery Kids would not automatically receive the new channel unless they negotiated for carriage. Discovery had announced that it would also relaunch the U.S. version of the network in a joint venture with Hasbro.

References

See also 
 Discovery Kids (U.S.)
 Discovery Kids (UK)

Canada
Children's television networks in Canada
Former Corus Entertainment networks
Defunct television networks in Canada
Television channels and stations established in 2001
Television channels and stations disestablished in 2009
2001 establishments in Ontario
2009 disestablishments in Ontario
Digital cable television networks in Canada